The Minister for Education is a senior  minister in the Government of Ireland and leads the Department of Education. The current Minister for Education is Norma Foley, TD.

She is assisted by Josepha Madigan, TD, Minister of State for Special Education and Inclusion.

Functions
The minister engages in a wide range of activities relating to education in the Republic of Ireland, including policy planning, quality assurance and the provision of a broad range of services.

The department officially aims to:
Promote equity and inclusion
Promote lifelong learning
Plan for education that is relevant to personal, social, cultural and economic needs.

In recent years some of these functions have been devolved to statutory authorities, in particular the Higher Education Authority, the National Qualifications Authority and the State Examinations Commission. Irish universities and colleges are to a large extent free of government control, with this being largely limited to policy formation and statistics preparation.

History
In 1919, the Gaelic League passed a motion calling for the Dáil to appoint a Minister for Irish, which was read into the record of the Dáil by the Ceann Comhairle. On 29 June 1920, John J. O'Kelly, known in Irish as Seán Ua Ceallaigh, and also by the pen name Sceilg, was appointed as Minister for Irish. The portfolio was created to promote the use of the Irish language throughout the country.

After the Second Dáil met in August 1921, the President Éamon de Valera proposed that this position be altered to that of Minister for Education, saying "It was obvious the Minister in charge should be capable of dealing with the part referring to Irish but he thought the Department should have a wider meaning than at present". This was accepted by the Dáil. The following day, when de Valera proposed his new ministry, O'Kelly was proposed as Minister for Education, continuing in his previous position with an expanded function.

It was given a statutory basis in the Irish Free State as one of the positions in the Executive Council under the Ministers and Secretaries Act 1924.

List of office-holders

Notes

References

External links
Department of Education

Government ministers of the Republic of Ireland
Lists of government ministers of Ireland
Minister
Ministries established in 1921
Ireland
Minister